Trisuloides is a genus of moths of the family Noctuidae.

Species
Trisuloides becheri H.L. Han, Behounek & Kononenko, 2011
Trisuloides catocalina Moore, 1883
Trisuloides papuensis Warren, 1912
Trisuloides prosericea H.L. Han, Behounek & Kononenko, 2011
Trisuloides rotundipennis Sugi, 1976
Trisuloides sericea Butler, 1881
Trisuloides taiwana Sugi, 1976
Trisuloides xizanga H.L. Han, Behounek & Kononenko, 2011
Trisuloides zhangi Y.X. Chen, 1994

References

 ; ;  2011: A revision of the genus Trisuloides Butler, 1881 with descriptions of three new species from China (Lepidoptera, Noctuidae). Revision of Pantheinae, contribution I. Zootaxa,  3069: 1–25. Preview
  1994: Four new species of Noctuidae from China (Lepidoptera). Acta entomologica sinica, 37(2): 215-217. PDF

Pantheinae